Sione Tuipulotu (born 12 February 1997) is an Australian professional rugby union player. He plays for Glasgow Warriors in the United Rugby Championship and for Scotland internationally. He previously played for Yamaha Júbilo in the Japanese Top League. His position is centre, but he can also play on the wing.

Rugby Union career

Professional career

He made his debut for the Rebels against the Queensland Reds as a late replacement for Tamati Ellison in  a 25–23 win for the Rebels, becoming the first ever 'home-grown' player to play for the Rebels.

He signed for the Japanese side Yamaha Júbilo with the intention of playing there in Super Rugby's off-season.

On 1 March 2021 it was announced that Tuipulotu would join Glasgow Warriors at the end of the Japanese Top league season. Tuipuloto said of the move: "I think my play style suit the Warriors' style. I’m a bit of a rugby nerd and I’ve watched a lot of their games – I’ve heard a lot about the speed of the Scotstoun pitch and I’m looking forward to playing that attacking fast style of rugby." Warriors Head Coach Danny Wilson said: "Sione is an exciting talent. He’s Scottish-qualified, and a really physical and powerful ball carrier who can play both centre and wing. His skill set and play style compliments the way we want to play."

He made his debut for the Glasgow club in the 'Clash of the Warriors' pre-season fixture against English side Worcester Warriors at their Sixways Stadium. The Glasgow Warriors won out, winning the match 27 – 22 and taking home the inaugural cup. He made his competitive debut for Glasgow in the 24 September 2021 match against Ulster away at Ravenhill Stadium in the United Rugby Championship – earning the Glasgow Warrior No. 332.

Super Rugby statistics

International career

Tuipulotu has a Scottish grandmother, who hails from Greenock.

In June 2021 Tuipulotu was called up to the Scotland squad for the summer internationals. He was selected to start against Tonga in the match scheduled for 29 October 2021.

He made his Scotland debut against Tonga on 30 October 2021. Scotland won the match 60 - 14.

He was capped by Scotland 'A' on 25 June 2022 in their match against Chile.

He scored his first Scotland points with 2 tries against Argentina on 19 November 2022

References

External links

 Sione Tuipulotu – Melbourne Rebels

1997 births
Living people
Scotland international rugby union players
Scottish rugby union players
Glasgow Warriors players
Australian rugby union players
Rugby union centres
Melbourne Rebels players
Melbourne Rising players
Rugby union players from Melbourne
Shizuoka Blue Revs players
Rugby union wings
Australian expatriate rugby union players
Australian people of Scottish descent
Australian sportspeople of Tongan descent
Expatriate rugby union players in Japan
Scottish expatriate rugby union players
Scotland 'A' international rugby union players
Australian expatriate sportspeople in Japan
Scottish expatriate sportspeople in Japan
Scottish people of Tongan descent
People from Frankston, Victoria